Special Section is a 1975 French film directed by Costa-Gavras and based on the novel L'affaire de la Section Spéciale by Hervé Villeré. It stars Louis Seigner, Roland Bertin, Michael Lonsdale, Ivo Garrani, François Maistre, Jacques Spiesser, Henri Serre, Heinz Bennent and Claude Piéplu. It is named after the Special Sections of Vichy France.

The film shared the Best Director prize at the 1975 Cannes Film Festival, and was nominated for Best Foreign Language Film by the U.S. National Board of Review. It was also nominated for a Golden Globe award for best foreign film.

Plot 
In France during the German occupation, a young German naval officer is killed in Paris by a group of leftist activists. The compliant Vichy government seeks to appease the Germans by locating the perpetrators and agreeing to the execution of six people, and a special section is set up for this purpose. The section consists of judges who are too ambitious, cowardly or inhuman to refuse such work. The flames of totalitarianism must be stoked, even with innocent blood, and it is especially convenient to the government if the accused are thoroughly expendable in their eyes.

Cast 
Louis Seigner - Le garde des Sceaux
Roland Bertin - Le secrétaire général du ministère de la Justice
Michael Lonsdale - Le ministre de l'intérieur
Ivo Garrani - L'amiral
François Maistre - Le délégué général
Jacques Spiesser - Fredo
Henri Serre - Le délégué du ministère de l'intérieur en zone occupée
Heinz Bennent - Maj. Beumelburg
Pierre Dux - Le procureur général
Jacques François - Le procureur de l'Etat
Claudio Gora - Le premier président de la cour d'appel
Michel Galabru - Le président Cournet
Claude Piéplu - Le président de la section spéciale
Hubert Gignoux - Le juge en 'noir'
Jacques Ouvrier - Le conseiller
Alain Nobis - Le premier conseiller
Jean Bouise - Le conseiller Linais
Nathalie Roussel

Reception
Costa-Gavras' film stirred some controversy as it told a story of Vichy France, which made some critics feel that it was a one-sided piece about collaboration. Costa-Gavras stated that he was aiming for the truth and felt that he achieved it with the film. Despite the debate, it opened to positive reviews in France and the U.S.

References

External links 

1975 drama films
1975 films
1970s war drama films
Films based on French novels
Films directed by Costa Gavras
Films produced by Jacques Perrin
Films scored by Michel Legrand
1970s French-language films
French war drama films
Vichy France in fiction
1970s French films